Lloyd Brewer (21 February 1929 – 29 November 2003) was  a former Australian rules footballer who played with Richmond in the Victorian Football League (VFL).

Notes

External links 		
		
		
		
		
		
		
		
1929 births		
2003 deaths		
Australian rules footballers from Victoria (Australia)		
Richmond Football Club players